Martin Brennan (born 1946 in Castlecomer, County Kilkenny) is an Irish retired sportsperson.  He played hurling with his local club Erin's Own and was a member of the Kilkenny senior inter-county team from 1967 until 1969.

References

1946 births
Living people
Erin's Own (Kilkenny) hurlers
Kilkenny inter-county hurlers
All-Ireland Senior Hurling Championship winners